Binibining Pilipinas 2006 was the 43rd edition of Binibining Pilipinas. It took place at the Smart Araneta Coliseum in Quezon City, Metro Manila, Philippines on March 4, 2006.

At the end of the night, Gionna Cabrera crowned Lia Andrea Ramos as Binibining Pilipinas Universe 2006, Carlene Aguilar crowned Anna Maris Igpit as Binibining Pilipinas-World 2006 and Precious Lara Quigaman crowned Denille Lou Valmonte as Binibining Pilipinas International 2006. Rosalyn Santiago was named First Runner-Up and Jeanne Bernadette Bello was named 2nd Runner-Up.

Results 
Color keys
  The contestant did not place but won a Special Award in the pageant.
  The contestant did not place.

Special Awards

Contestants 
24 contestants competed for the three titles.

Notes

Post-pageant Notes 

 Lia Andrea Ramos competed at Miss Universe 2006 in Los Angeles, California but was unplaced. However, Ramos won the Miss Photogenic award. She is currently the head of the  Women Empowerment Committee for the Miss Universe Philippines Organization.
 Anna Maris Igpit competed at Miss World 2006 in Warsaw but was unplaced. Denille Lou Valmonte was also unplaced when she competed at Miss International 2006 in Beijing.
 Marie-Ann Umali competed again at Binibining Pilipinas 2009, where she was crowned as Binibining Pilipinas World 2009. She competed at Miss World 2009 in Johannesburg but was unplaced.

References 

2006
2006 in the Philippines
2006 beauty pageants